İncik can refer to:

 İncik, Çankırı
 İncik, Emirdağ